This article is about the particular significance of the year 1834 to Wales and its people.

Incumbents
Lord Lieutenant of Anglesey – Henry Paget, 1st Marquess of Anglesey 
Lord Lieutenant of Brecknockshire – Henry Somerset, 6th Duke of Beaufort
Lord Lieutenant of Caernarvonshire – Peter Drummond-Burrell, 22nd Baron Willoughby de Eresby 
Lord Lieutenant of Cardiganshire – William Edward Powell
Lord Lieutenant of Carmarthenshire – George Rice, 3rd Baron Dynevor 
Lord Lieutenant of Denbighshire – Sir Watkin Williams-Wynn, 5th Baronet    
Lord Lieutenant of Flintshire – Robert Grosvenor, 1st Marquess of Westminster 
Lord Lieutenant of Glamorgan – John Crichton-Stuart, 2nd Marquess of Bute 
Lord Lieutenant of Merionethshire – Sir Watkin Williams-Wynn, 5th Baronet
Lord Lieutenant of Montgomeryshire – Edward Herbert, 2nd Earl of Powis
Lord Lieutenant of Pembrokeshire – Sir John Owen, 1st Baronet
Lord Lieutenant of Radnorshire – George Rodney, 3rd Baron Rodney
Bishop of Bangor – Christopher Bethell 
Bishop of Llandaff – Edward Copleston 
Bishop of St Asaph – William Carey 
Bishop of St Davids – John Jenkinson

Events
12 February - The city of Bangor, Maine, is incorporated in the United States. It is said to have been named after the Welsh hymn tune "Bangor".
23 June - HMS Tartarus is launched at Pembroke Dock. It is the Royal Navy's first steam-powered man-of-war (a paddle gunvessel).
27 December - A ferry from Penally to Caldey sinks and 15 people drown.
29 December - The West of England and South Wales District Bank is established in Bristol.
unknown dates
William Williams of Wern starts the "General Union" movement.
The government begins to make grants of 50% towards the erection of new elementary schools in England and Wales; hence the Treasury awards £84 for a school to be set up at Abergwili.
Border Breweries (Wrexham) begin operation at the Nag's Head public house.
Walter Rice Howell Powell inherits the Maesgwynne estate. Nicholas, Thomas.

Arts and literature
At an eisteddfod held in Cardiff, Augusta Hall, Lady Llanover, wins a prize for her essay on the Welsh language.  Taliesin Williams wins the chair.

New books
Sir Harford Jones Brydges - An Account of His Majesty's Mission to Persia in the years 1807-11
Thomas Medwin - The Angler in Wales: Or, Days and Nights of Sportsmen
John Humffreys Parry - The Cambrian Plutarch: Comprising Memoirs of Some of the Most Eminent Welshmen

Music
Foulk Robert Williams - Llyfr Cerddoriaeth o Gerddi Sion... (unpublished MS)

Births
15 February - Sir William Henry Preece, engineer (d. 1913)
31 March - Thomas Rees Jones, engineer and inventor (d. 1897)
14 April - Arthur John Williams, lawyer, author and politician (d. 1911)
2 July - Stuart Rendel, 1st Baron Rendel, politician (d. 1913)
23 August - Hugh Owen Thomas, orthopaedic surgeon (d. 1891)
16 October - Pryce Pryce-Jones, mail order entrepreneur (d. 1920)
21 December - Griffith Rhys Jones, choirmaster and conductor (d. 1897)
date unknown - William Thomas (Gwilym Marles), minister (d. 1879)

Deaths
17 February - John Thelwall, Welsh-descended orator, writer, political reformer, journalist, poet, elocutionist and speech therapist, 69
29 March - John Mytton, eccentric squire and politician of the Welsh border country, 37 (alcohol-related)
13 May - John Jones, clergyman and writer, 58
20 June - John Wynne Griffith, politician, 71
9 July - Dafydd Cadwaladr, preacher, 82
11 August - William Crawshay I, industrialist, about 70 (b. 1764)
2 September - David Charles, hymn-writer (b. 1762)

References

 
Wales